Norman Butterworth Rippon (10 January 1878 – 7 November 1977) was an Australian rules footballer who played with Melbourne and South Melbourne in the Victorian Football League (VFL).

Family
The son of Samuel Rippon (1845-1897), and Lucretia Eliza Rippon (1848-1899), née Butterworth, Norman Butterworth Rippon was born at St Kilda, Victoria on 10 January 1878.

His brothers, Les and Harold, also played for Melbourne in the VFL.

He married Margaret Wilhelmina Paul (1884-1926), at Myrtleford, Victoria, on 1 July 1916. He married Alice Victoria Hansen (1892-1965), at Bayswater, Victoria, on 20 November 1926. His son, Norman, a promising cricketer, who worked on his father's farm at Kongwak, in Gippsland, Victoria was killed in a motor accident in 1939.

Footnotes

References
 
 South Melbourne Team, Punch, (Thursday, 4 June 1903), p.16.

External links 

 
 Norm Rippon, demonwiki.org.

1878 births
Australian rules footballers from Melbourne
Melbourne Football Club players
Sydney Swans players

1977 deaths
People from St Kilda, Victoria